General elections were held in Zambia on 12 December 1978. At the time, the country was a one-party state with the United National Independence Party (UNIP) as the sole legal party. UNIP leader Kenneth Kaunda was automatically elected to a fourth five-year term as President, with 80.7% of voters voting to confirm him in office. UNIP also won all 125 seats in the National Assembly. Voter turnout was around 65% in the parliamentary election, but 66.7% in the presidential election.

Campaign
Prior to the elections, primary elections were held to elect candidates for the 125 constituencies. Only UNIP members could vote in the primaries, and the top three candidates would be able to stand for the National Assembly election. However, 30 candidates who had won primaries, including six sitting MPs, were vetoed by the party's central committee. In total, 732 people stood for election to the National Assembly. In six constituencies (in which there were 87,482 registered voters) there was only one candidate, who was returned unopposed.

Results

President
Kaunda was the sole candidate for president, and voters voted yes or no to his candidacy.

National Assembly

See also
List of members of the National Assembly of Zambia (1978–83)

References

Zambia
General
Elections in Zambia
One-party elections
Presidential elections in Zambia
Election and referendum articles with incomplete results
Zambia